The surname Hawken comes from the Nordic given name Haakon, the name of seven Norwegian kings. The given name evolved to Hakon, and variations include: Håkon, Haakon, Horken, Hörken, Hawkin, Hawkins, and Hawken. Hawken is a possible variation of the English language surname "Hawkins".

It is also used as a first name, mostly amongst direct Norwegian lineages.

People with the name Hawken include:

 Dominic Hawken (born 1967), keyboard player and session musician
 Jacob and Samuel Hawken (1786-1849) and (1792-1884), American gunsmiths
 John Hawken (born 1940), English keyboard player
 Les Hawken (born 1949), former Australian rules footballer
 Nicholas Hawken (1836-1908), English-born Australian politician
 Paul Hawken (born 1946) American environmentalist, entrepreneur, author, and activist
 Roger Hawken (1878-1947), Australian engineer
 Spencer Hawken (born 1973), British director, writer, producer and film critic

Given name
 Walter Hawken Tregellas
 Hawken King a British artist and programmer, founder of video games company Dadako

Norwegian-language surnames